Chemba District is one of the seven districts of the Dodoma Region of Tanzania. It was formed after 2010, when it was split off from Kondoa District. Chemba District is bordered to the north by Kondoa District, to the east by Manyara Region, to the south by Chamwino District and Bahi District, and to the west by Singida Region. Its administrative seat is the town of Chemba.

According to the 2012 Tanzania National Census, the population of Chemba District was 235,711.

Transport

Trunk road T5 from Dodoma to Babati passes through the district.

Administrative subdivisions
As of 2012, Chemba District was administratively divided into 20 wards.

Wards

 Chandama
 Chemba
 Churuku
 Dalai
 Farkwa
 Goima
 Gwandi
 Jangalo
 Kimaha
 Kwamtoro
 Lalta
 Makorongo
 Mondo
 Mpendo
 Mrijo
 Msaada
 Ovada
 Paranga
 Sanzawa
 Songoro

References

Districts of Dodoma Region